Viliam Hýravý (born 26 November 1962, in Ružomberok) is a Slovak football player. He played on the position of left defender.

He played for Czechoslovakia, for whom he played 11 matches. He was a participant in the 1990 FIFA World Cup.

On the club level he played for BZ Ružomberok, ZVL Zilina, Dukla Banska Bystrica and Czech club Baník Ostrava. In the 1991–92 season he played for Toulouse FC. Before retiring he played for MFK Ružomberok, where he currently works as manager's assistant.

References 

1962 births
Living people
Sportspeople from Ružomberok
Czechoslovak footballers
Czechoslovakia international footballers
Slovak footballers
Slovakia international footballers
Toulouse FC players
Ligue 1 players
1990 FIFA World Cup players
Czech First League players
FC Baník Ostrava players
MŠK Žilina players
Slovak Super Liga players
Dual internationalists (football)
Czechoslovak expatriate footballers
Czechoslovak expatriate sportspeople in France
Expatriate footballers in France
Association football forwards